All About Two is a one-off comedy panel show hosted by Dara Ó Briain. It aired on BBC Two on 20 April 2014 to celebrate 50 years of the channel.

Programme summary

Richard Osman was on hand to give some facts about BBC Two.

Additional guests include Paul Hollywood, Ainsley Harriott, Joan Bakewell, Rebecca Front and Sir David Attenborough.

External links

BBC Two site

English-language television shows
BBC Two
2014 television specials